Parkers may refer to:

Parker's, an Australian pretzels company
Parker's Car Guides, a British car magazine
The Parkers, an American television sitcom

See also
Parker (disambiguation)